I Modi (The Ways), also known as The Sixteen Pleasures or under the Latin title De omnibus Veneris Schematibus, is a famous erotic book of the Italian Renaissance in which a series of sexual positions were explicitly depicted in engravings.

There are now no known copies of the first two original editions of "I modi" by Marcantonio Raimondi. There is one engraving and nine fragments cut from engravings in the British Museum, and it is thought that these engravings were made by Agostino Veneziano by copying from drawings offset from an original edition of "I modi".

There is a booklet of images of sexual scenes created around 1555 that is thought to have been copied from Agostino Veneziano's copy of the "I modi". This booklet of images is thought to copy 12 images from the Agostino veneziano copy of I modi.

Marcantonio Raimondi edition

The first edition of I modi was created by the engraver Marcantonio Raimondi, basing his sixteen images of sexual positions on, according to one view, a series of erotic paintings that Giulio Romano was doing as a commission for Federico II Gonzaga’s new Palazzo Te in Mantua.  

A second idea is that a set of drawings that were offset from Giulio Romano's Modi drawings might have been what Marcantonio Raimondi based his engravings on.

One idea is that Giulio Romano had seen ancient Roman Spintria tokens and that these tokens provided him with ideas for the drawings and paintings that he created. The same drawings and paintings that Raimnodi is thought to have based the I modi engravings on.

The engravings were published by Marcantonio in 1524, and led to his imprisonment by Pope Clement VII and the destruction of all copies of the illustrations. 

Giulio Romano did not become aware of the engravings by Raimondi until the poet Pietro Aretino came to see his paintings. These are the paintings that Raimondi is thought to have based his engravings on and Romano was still working on these paintings when Aretino came to visit. Romano was not prosecuted since—unlike Marcantonio—his images were not intended for public consumption, and he was not in the Papal States. 

Aretino then composed sixteen explicit sonnets to accompany the paintings/engravings, and secured Marcantonio's release from prison.

I Modi was then published a second time in 1527, now with the sonnets that have given them the traditional English title Aretino's Postures. It is thought that this is the first time erotic text and images were combined, though the papacy once more seized all the copies it could find. It is thought Raimondi escaped prison on this second occasion, but the suppression on both occasions was comprehensive.

There are presently no remaining copies of the first edition or the second edition of the "I modi" that contained the engravings by Raimondi.

Agostino Veneziano copy of "I modi"

It is thought that Agostino Veneziano may have engraved a single replacement set of engravings based on a set of drawings that were offset from when Marcantonio created the engravings for "I modi".

It is thought that this replacement set of images is where both the nine partial fragments cut from seven engravings and the whole image of one single engraving in the Biritish Museum have come from.

It is thought that Agostino created this replacement set of engravings with the help of other people.  This replacement is thought to have been created in a different style to that of Marcantonios originals.

Copies of the Agostino Veneziano copy of "I modi" 
Woodcut copy - around 1555

A possibly infringing  copy with crude illustrations created using woodcut relief printing was created around 1555.

This woodcut booklet was bound in with some contemporary texts and was discovered in the 1920s.

It is thought that twelve of the fourteen images in this woodcut booklet have been copied from Agostino Veneziano's copy of I Modi and the artist is unknown. In this woodcut booklet there are two images "... in the abbreviated final signature...[that] seem to come from different traditions. 

Some of the leaves are missing from this booklet and there were I modi related images on these leaves.

This woodcut copy booklet shows that there were more engravings in the first edition of "I modi" by Raimondi than is shown in the engravings from the British Museum. 

Engraving in the Albertina Museum

There is one whole image of an engraving in the Albertina museum that is thought to have been based on an image from the copy of "I modi" that Agostino Veneziano is thought to have made. It is thought that this single engraving comes from a set of engravings and only this one engraving presently remains from this set.

This single engraving in the Albertina matches an oval fragment in the British museum and one of the  woodcut copy images. It is numbered in the bottom right corner with two and  has been dated to the 16th century and the artist is unknown.

Francesco Xanto Avelli Maiolica dish

It is thought that between 1531 and 1535 Francesco Xanto Avelli saw Agostino Veneziano's copy of I modi. Xanto painted a maiolica dish titled The Tiber in Flood and there are figures copied from four I modi engravings on the maiolica dish.

Parmigianino drawing

Parmigianino drew a copy of one of the engravings in the "I modi" with sex occurring between two figures who are seated. This copy is similar to the woodcut copy image numbered 10. It includes similar postures of the figures and details of drapery and furniture.

Engraving in the National Library of Spain

An engraving by an anonymous artist in the National Library of Spain copies one scene from the "I modi" and this scene is not present in the woodcut copy booklet.  The scene shows two figures seated having sex with a wooden cradle lying on the ground next to them and the foot of the male is rocking the cradle.

 Two Henry Wallesley engravings 

Henry Wellesley owned two engravings that were related to I Modi and they are now in the collection of the National Library of France. One engraving was similar to the whole single image in the British Museum and was numbered and the other engraving was similar to the image in the Albertina Museum and was numbered two.

 Bartsch and Delaborde descriptions

Henri Delaborde and Adam Bartsch gave descriptions of images as belonging to the "I modi". The descriptions that they gave do not relate to any existing images and perhaps are examples of additional images that may have been in the original "I modi".

17th century printing of Aretino's posutres

In the 17th century, certain Fellows of All Souls College, Oxford, engaged in the surreptitious printing at the University Press of Aretino's Postures, Aretino's De omnis Veneris schematibus and the indecent engravings after Raimondi and Giulio Romano. The Dean, Dr. John Fell, impounded the copper plates and threatened those involved  with expulsion. The text of Aretino's sonnets, however, survives.

Leda and the swan engraving - Agostino Veneziano 

There is an engraving of Leda and the swan in an erotic scene that is thought to be by Agostino Veneziano in the British Museum. The engraving has the same dimensions and format as the "I modi" engravings and one idea is that the image on this engraving was a part of the original "I modi" by Marcantonio.

Images from I modi copies 
Below are the woodcut copy images as they appear from 1 to 16 in the woodcut copy booklet alongside engravings from the British Museum.  One of the leaves is missing from this booklet and there were images on these leaves that correspond to the missing numbers in this series 1 to 16. Also included alongside the woodcut copy images are two drawings by Parmigianino and one engraving from the Albertina museum by an anonymous artist.

Agostino Carracci

Engravings by Camillo Procaccini or Agostino Carracci
A new series of graphic and explicit engravings of sexual positions was produced by Camillo Procaccini or more likely by Agostino Carracci for a later reprint of Aretino's poems.

Annibale Carracci 
Annibale Carracci also completed the elaborate fresco of Loves of the Gods for the Palazzo Farnese in Rome (where the Farnese Hercules which influenced them both him and Agostino Carraci was housed). These images were drawn from Ovid's Metamorphoses and include nudes, but (in contrast to the sexual engravings) are not explicit, intimating rather than directly depicting the act of lovemaking.

Augustine Carracci's The Aretin or Collection of Erotic Postures - Jacques Joseph Coiny

In 1798 in Paris a collection of engravings of sexual scenes were published under the title Augustine Carracci's The Aretin or Collection of Erotic Postures. The engravings were created by Jacques Joseph Coiny.

The word "Aretin" in the title of this collection of engravings is possibly there as it became to mean any work that was related to sexual and mythological images.

One theory in relation to what images these etchings were inspired by is that they were inspired by the erotic poses in 'The Loves of the Gods' which was created at the start of the 17th century in Antwerp by Pieter de Jode I with the use of burin. It presently remains uncertain what images these engravings were inspired by. It is thought that Coiny had a set of six anonymous prints and it is difficult to say which prints these were.

Classical guise in Augustine Carracci's The Aretin or Collection of Erotic Postures
Several factors were used to cloak these engravings from Augustine Carracci's The Aretin or Collection of Erotic Postures in classical scholarly respectability:
 The images nominally depicted famous pairings of lovers (e.g. Antony and Cleopatra) or husband-and-wife deities (e.g. Jupiter and Juno) from classical history and mythology engaged in sexual activity, and were entitled as such. Related to this were:
 Portraying them with their usual attributes, such as:
 Cleopatra's banquets, bottom left
 Achilles's shield and helmet, bottom left
 Hercules in his lion-skin and club
 Mars with his cuirass
 Paris as a shepherd
 Bacchus with his vine-leaf crown and (bottom right) grapes
 Referring to the best known myths or historical events in which they appeared e.g.:
 Mars and Venus under the net which her husband Vulcan has designed to catch them
 'Aeneas' and 'Dido' in the cave in which their sexual intercourse is alluded in Aeneid, Book 4
 Theseus abandoning Ariadne on Naxos, where Bacchus finds and marries her.
 the wide adultery of Julia
 Messalina's participation in prostitution, as criticised in Juvenal's Satire VI.
 Referring to other Renaissance and classical tropes in the depiction of these people and deities, such as
 The contrast between Mars's dark hair and tanned skin and his partner Venus's untanned, fair skin and fair or even blond hair.
 Jupiter's full beard
 the frontispiece image is entitled Venus Genetrix, and the goddess is nude and drawn in a chariot by doves, as in the classical sources.
 the bodies of those depicted show clear influences from classical statuary known at the time, such as:
 the over-muscled torsos and backs of the men(drawn from sculptures such as the Laocoön and his Sons, Belvedere Torso, and Farnese Hercules).
 the women's clearly defined though small breasts (drawn from examples such as the Venus de' Medici and Aphrodite of Cnidus)
 the elaborate hairstyles of some of the women, such as his Venus, Juno or Cleopatra (derived from Roman Imperial era busts such as this one).
 Portraying the action in a classical 'stage set' such as an ancient Greek sanctuary or temple.
 The large erect penis on the statue of Priapus or Pan atop a puteal in 'The Cult of Priapus' is derived from examples in classical sculpture and painting (like this fresco) which were beginning to be found archaeologically at this time.

Differences from antique art
Augustine Carracci's The Aretin or Collection of Erotic Postures has various points of deviation from classical literature, erotica, mythology and art which suggest its classical learning is lightly worn, and make clear its actual modern setting:
 The male sexual partners' large penises (though not Priapus's) are the artist's invention rather than a classical borrowing – the idealised penis in classical art was small, not large (large penises were seen as comic or fertility symbols, as for example on Priapus, as discussed above).
 The title 'Polyenus and Chryseis' pairs the fictional Polyenus with the actual mythological character Chryseis.
 The title 'Alcibiades and Glycera' pairs two historical figures from different periods – the 5th century BC Alcibiades and the 4th century BC Glycera
 Female satyrs did not occur in classical mythology, yet they appear twice in this work (in 'The Satyr and his wife' and 'The Cult of Priapus').
 All the women and goddesses in this work (but most clearly its Venus Genetrix) have a hairless groin (like classical statuary of nude females) but also a clearly apparent vulva (unlike classical statuary).
 The modern furniture, e.g.
 The various stools and cushions used to support the participants or otherwise raise them into the right positions (e.g. here)
 The other sex aids (e.g. a whip, bottom right)
 The 16th-century beds, with ornate curtains, carvings, tasselled cushions, bedposts, etc.

Engravings from Augustine Carracci's The Aretin or Collection of Erotic Postures

The images in the table below are the engravings from Augustine Carracci's The Aretin or Collection of Erotic Postures.

These engravings have inspired the creation of erotic art from other artists including Paul Avril.

Cultural References 
The Restoration closet drama Farce of Sodom is set in "an antechamber hung with Aretine's postures."

See also

 History of erotic depictions
 Homosexuality in ancient Greece
 Homosexuality in ancient Rome
 Sexuality in ancient Rome

References

Notes
Talvacchia, Bette "Taking Positions: On the Erotic in Renaissance Culture" Princeton University Press 1999 Page: 250 isbn:978-0691026329

External links

Selection of images in various versions

1524 books
1527 books
Censored books
Erotic art
Erotic literature
19th-century prints
Prints and drawings in the British Museum
Renaissance prints
Sex manuals
16th-century prints